GSZ Stadium or Gymnastic Club Zenon Stadium (Γ.Σ.Ζ.) was a stadium in Larnaca, Cyprus. It was constructed in 1928 thanks to the donation of Demetrios N. Demetriou. From then until 1989, the stadium served as the home ground of EPA, Pezoporikos and Alki. In 1989 it was demolished and replaced by the new GSZ Stadium. Since 2003 the area serves as a sports park. 

Defunct sports venues in Cyprus